Jane (occassionally Jean) Gordon, Viscountess Kenmure born Jane Campbell maybe Lady Montgomery (? – February, 1675) was a Scottish patron of ministers. She married twice and was well regarded. She is particularly noted for her support of Samuel Rutherford and other covenanters.

Life
She was the third daughter of Lady Agnes Douglas and her husband Archibald Campbell, 7th Earl of Argyll (1575/6–1638)

By 1626 she married to Sir John Gordon of Lochinvar. He was made Viscount Kenmure in 1633 and he died on 12 September 1634. He had give in to Charles I's religious changes and he was remembered for that weakness, but she was always well regarded. She married again in 1640 to Sir Henry (Harry) Montgomerie and he died in 1644. She had continued to use the title of "Viscountess Kenmore" and she was now the owner of her second husband's estates including the barony of Giffen, Ayrshire. In 1648 she accepted an offer from her father-in-law, Alexander Montgomerie, 6th Earl of Eglinton. She gave him the barony in exchanges for a payment of 2,500 merks every year for life.

She is noted for her charitable support in Scotland. In particular the support and friendship she gave to Samuel Rutherford. Rutherford sent her a large number of letters which are extant.

In 1645, the book "Turtle Dove" by Fullerton of Carleton was dedicated to her.

Biographies
Gordan's biography is included in three books. In 1850 the Reverend James Anderson included her in "The Ladies of the Covenant: Memoirs of Distinguished Scottish Female Characters, Embracing the Period of the Covenant and the Persecution". Books of similar scope are William Chapman's work of 1883 and Donald Beaton's of 1909.

References

1675 deaths
Covenanters
Scottish women
Daughters of British earls
British viscountesses